Minute Man Air Field  is a public-use airport in Stow, Massachusetts, United States. The airport is privately owned by Minute Man Airfield, Inc.

History
Started as a  grass landing strip known as Erikson Field in 1963 by local pilots, the airport was purchased by Paul McPherson in 1966. McPherson and his son, Don, paved and extended the  runway, added a parallel taxiway and tie-downs for 50 planes, installed AVGAS pumps, and constructed the Operations Building. The former grass strip was re-opened as Minute Man Air Field on July 1, 1969. McPherson's wife and daughter later opened a small coffee shop on the field called "Peg's Place".

Over the decades, the airport has added aircraft maintenance and storage hangars, a runway extension, a second cross-wind runway, and aircraft parking aprons. In the early 1990s,  of land was added to the field's land holdings, instead of becoming a housing development. The open space is being farmed and serves as home to many species of wildlife. This acreage was sold and is the site of a proposed 55+ active adult neighborhood consisting of 60+ housing units.

Minute Man now has a  paved, lighted and instrumented runway and a  gravel-visual runway.

The airfield is home to more than 60 aircraft, including three helicopters stored in four hangars and on tie-downs along the taxi-ways and aprons. In addition to Nancy's Air Field Café, the airport is home to numerous other businesses.

The airport is still owned and operated by McPherson, and the operations are overseen by a board of Airport Commissioners. The board is made up of local business, government and aviation professionals who voluntarily serve as commissioners.

Facilities and aircraft 
 Runway 3/21: , asphalt
 Runway 12/30: , turf/gravel

For the 12-month period ending 1 August 2009 the airport had 48,095 aircraft operations, an average of 132 per day: 99% general aviation, <1% air taxi and <1% military. There are 67 aircraft based at this airport: 60 single engine, one multi engine, three helicopters and three ultralights.

The runway was repaved (to meet FAA required standards for safety) in the summer of 2015. The work also included removing a small hill which was a danger to people in airplanes landing from the south.

Gallery

References

External links 

 
 Nancy's Air Field Cafe

Stow, Massachusetts
Airports in Middlesex County, Massachusetts